The Shiva Purana is one of eighteen major texts of the Purana genre of Sanskrit texts in Hinduism, and part of the Shaivism literature corpus. It primarily revolves around the Hindu god Shiva and goddess Parvati, but references and reveres all gods.

The Shiva Purana asserts that it once consisted of 100,000 verses set out in twelve Samhitas (Books), however the Purana adds that it was abridged by Sage Vyasa before being taught to Romaharshana. The surviving manuscripts exist in many different versions and content, with one major version with seven books (traced to South India), another with six books, while the third version traced to the medieval Bengal region of the Indian subcontinent with no books but two large sections called Purva-Khanda (Previous Section) and Uttara-Khanda (Later Section). The two versions that include books, title some of the books same and others differently. The Shiva Purana, like other Puranas in Hindu literature, was likely a living text, which was routinely edited, recast and revised over a long period of time. The oldest manuscript of surviving texts was likely composed, estimates Klaus Klostermaier, around 10th- to 11th-century CE. Some chapters of currently surviving Shiva Purana manuscripts were likely composed after the 14th-century.

The Shiva Purana contains chapters with Shiva-centered cosmology, mythology, relationship between Gods, ethics, yoga, tirtha (pilgrimage) sites, bhakti, rivers and geography, and other topics. The text is an important source of historic information on different types and theology behind Shaivism in early 2nd-millennium CE. The oldest surviving chapters of the Shiva Purana have significant Advaita Vedanta philosophy, which is mixed in with theistic elements of bhakti.

In the 19th and 20th century, the Vayu Purana was sometimes titled as Shiva Purana, and sometimes proposed as a part of the complete Shiva Purana. With the discovery of more manuscripts, modern scholarship considers the two texts as different, with Vayu Purana as the more older text composed sometime before the 2nd-century CE. Some scholars list it as a Mahapurana, while some state it is an Upapurana.

Date
The date and authors of Shiva Purana are unknown. No authentic data is available. Scholars such as Klostermaier as well as Hazra estimate that the oldest chapters in the surviving manuscript were likely composed around the 10- to 11th-centuries CE, which has not stood the test of carbon dating technology hence on that part we must rely on the text itself which tells when it was composed. Certain books and chapters in currently surviving Shiva Purana manuscripts were likely composed later, some after the 14th-century. The Shiva Purana, like other Puranas in Hindu literature, were routinely edited, recast and revised over the centuries.

Hazra states that the Bombay manuscript published in the 19th-century is rarer, and is likely older than other versions published from eastern and southern India.

Different manuscripts

Several recensions of this text exist. The Bombay 1884 manuscript recension published by the Vangavasi Press, Calcutta in 1896 consists of six s (sections):  

The second manuscript of Shiva Purana published in 1906, reprinted in 1965, by the Pandita Pustakalaya, Kashi consists of seven s:

The number of verses in these sections were as follows:
 Vidyeshvara Samhita - 10,000
 Rudra Samhita - 8,000
 Vainayaka Samhita - 8,000
 Uma Samhita - 8,000
 Matri Samhita - 8,000
 Rudraikadasha Samhita - 13,000
 Kailasa Samhita - 6,000
 Shatarudra Samhita - 3,000
 Sahasrakotirudra Samhita - 11,000
 Kotirudra Samhita - 9,000
 Vayaviya Samhita - 4,000
 Dharma Samhita - 12,000

The  consists 3270 s in 51 chapters written in Nagari script and the  has 45 chapters written in Oriya script. It was preserved in Mahimprakash Brahmachari Matha in Puri.

Contents
The Vidyesvara Samhita, also called Vighnesa Samhita or Vidyasara Samhita, appears in both editions, is free of mythology found in some other samhitas, and is dedicated to describing the greatness and the bhakti of Shiva, particularly through the icon of Linga. This section is also notable for mentioning both Shaiva Agamas and Tantric texts, but frequently quoting from the Vedas and asserting that the text is the essence of the Vedic teaching and the Vedanta. The chapters of this shared samhita in different versions of the Shiva Purana includes a description of India's geography and rivers from north and south India so often and evenly that Hazra states it is difficult to gauge if this part was composed in north or south India.

The Jnanasamhita in one manuscript shares content with Rudrasamhita of the other manuscript, presents cosmology and mythology, and is notable for its discussion of saguna andnirguna Shiva.

The text discusses goddesses and gods, dedicates parts of chapters praising Vishnu and Brahma, as well as those related to avatars such as Krishna. It asserts that one must begin with karma-yajna, thereon step by step with tapo-yajna, then self study, then regular meditation, ultimately to jnana-yajna and yoga to achieve sayujya (intimate union) with Shiva within. The text emphasizes bhakti and yoga, rather than bookish learning of the Vedas.

The Shiva Purana dedicates chapters to Shaiva-Advaita philosophy, like Linga Purana and other Shaivism-related Puranas, advocating it as a system for Salvation. The text also presents the Brahman as satcitananda theme, with masculine and feminine Shiva-Shakti as a unity, and perception of plurality-discrimination as a form of nescience. Love-Driven Devotionalism (Bhakti), asserts the text, leads to knowledge, and such love combined with knowledge leads to attracting saintly people and guru, and with them one attains Liberation, states Shiva Purana. These ideas, states Klaus Klostermaier, are similar to those found in Devi-related Puranas and Shakti Literature.

The popular books and easy-to-read books on Shiva Purana is published by diamond books in various languages and in all formats.

References

Bibliography

External links
 The Shiva Purana English translation by J. L. Shastri, 1970 (includes glossary)

 Surya And Nairrta On The Siva Temple Of Prambanan, Roy E. Jordaan (1992), pages 59–66, Brill (Puranas/Shiva texts in southeast Asia)

Puranas
Shaiva texts